Homeobox protein Hox-A3 is a protein that in humans is encoded by the HOXA3 gene.

Function 

In vertebrates, the genes encoding the class of transcription factors called homeobox genes are found in clusters named A, B, C, and D on four separate chromosomes. Expression of these proteins is spatially and temporally regulated during embryonic development. This gene is part of the A cluster on chromosome 7 and encodes a DNA-binding transcription factor which may regulate gene expression, morphogenesis, and differentiation. Three transcript variants encoding two different isoforms have been found for this gene.

During normal fetal development, HoxA3 is expressed in mesenchymal neural crest cells and endodermal cells found in the third pharyngeal pouch. Expression of HoxA3 in these cells affects the proper formation of the thymus, thyroid, and parathyroid organs. While the gene does not seem to affect the proliferation or migration of the pharyngeal neural crest cells, it does appear to trigger cellular differentiation events required to form these organs. Knockout of HoxA3 leads to failure in forming the thymus (athymia) and parathyroid gland (aparthyroidism). Mutant HoxA3 also causes a reduction in thyroid size. While the follicular and parafollicular cells still differentiate, their numbers are reduced and they are not evenly distributed throughout the gland. Mutant HoxA3 models show similar phenotypes as those seen in DiGeorge’s Syndrome, and it is possible that the two are linked.

Regulation 

The HOXA3 gene is repressed by the microRNA miR-10a.

See also 
 Homeobox

References

Further reading

External links 
 

Transcription factors